Baja California Railroad, Inc. (BJRR) is a class III railroad operating in the northwest of Baja California, interchanging with San Diego and Imperial Valley Railroad in San Ysidro, California. After rehabilitation efforts are completed on the Desert Line portion of the railroad, an interchange is also planned with the Union Pacific Railroad in Plaster City, California.

The railroad is managed by ADMICARGA, a Baja California government entity. It does not connect to any other railroads in Mexico's rail system.

Operations 

BJRR's biggest clients are Z Gas, North StarGas, Empacadora Rosarito, and Cuauhtémoc Moctezuma Brewery in Tecate, which receives large amounts of grain and corn syrup imports.

Other clients receive shipments such as borax, pig lard, lumber, steel, paper, and cattle feed.

History 
The BJRR is the technical operating and maintenance assistant of the rail line's Baja California segment under agreement from the railroad's operator, ADMICARGA.

In February 2013, the local Baja California directors of BJRR announced an investment of $20 million to upgrade the neglected track. The first area to be developed was the first  from the border in Tijuana to El Florido as far as Matanuco. Work started in May 2013 with the building of the Tijuana railroad yard; the focus was on more track capacity, in conjunction with the upcoming San Ysidro Freight Rail Yard Improvement Project by SANDAG.

In June 2016, Baja California Railroad secured a 100-year lease with the San Diego Metropolitan Transit System (SDMTS) to rehabilitate and operate an additional  of track in the United States between Campo, California and Plaster City, California. The line, with 57 bridges and 17 tunnels, will be rehabilitated in three phases: Phase 1, Campo to Jacumba Hot Springs, California; phase 2, Dos Cabezas (near Ocotillo Wells, California) to Plaster City; and phase 3, from Jacumba to Dos Cabezas. The railroad paid SDMTS $1 million per year to retain its lease; Baja California Railroad stopped paying SDMTS beginning in 2020, breaking its lease.

Route and stations

Tijuana Station

Tijuana Station is located immediately to the south of the US San Ysidro Port of Entry. The station is now in a  three-story building that contains new administrative offices, an operations and logistics control center, offices for ADMICARGA (the railroad's operator), customs control, a customs agency (broker), the Mexican Secretariat of Agriculture and Rural Development, and the State Committee of Vegetable Sanitation (CESV). There is also space for sixty-eight  cars. The original railway station, built in the late 1920s, will become a railway museum.

García Station

García Station is farther east, near La Mesa of Tijuana municipality. It has a  two-story building with a reception area and offices for customer service, administration, and logistics.

References 

Railway companies established in 2010
Railway companies of Mexico
Standard gauge railways in Mexico